Geraldo Alberto Antonio (born 20 August 1994) is an Angolan retired professional football player. After retiring, he became a rapper under the name Chamo.

Career
He made his professional debut as Jong PSV player in the second division on 3 August 2013 against Sparta Rotterdam.

In 2017, 23-year-old António decided to retire to focus on his rap career under the name Chamo.

References

External links
 Voetbal International profile 
 

1994 births
Living people
Angolan footballers
Angolan expatriate footballers
Association football forwards
Excelsior Rotterdam players
Feyenoord players
AZ Alkmaar players
Sparta Rotterdam players
PSV Eindhoven players
Jong PSV players
C.D. Santa Clara players
FC Lisse players
Eerste Divisie players
Derde Divisie players
Liga Portugal 2 players
Expatriate footballers in the Netherlands
Expatriate footballers in Portugal
Expatriate footballers in Belgium
Angolan expatriate sportspeople in the Netherlands
Angolan expatriate sportspeople in Portugal
Angolan expatriate sportspeople in Belgium